Martin Luther King High School (or King) is a public high school in Riverside, California.

Background
Martin Luther King High School opened in 1999 and was the first high school to be built in Riverside, California since 1973. The first year enrollment was 858 students in grades 9 and 10. Martin Luther King High School added grade 11 in 2000 and grade 12 in 2001. Its first class graduated in 2002. Its first four-year class (students who attended Martin Luther King High School for all four years of their high school career) graduated in 2003.

Advanced Placement
The following Advanced Placement (AP) classes are offered:

AP Biology
AP Calculus AB
AP Calculus BC
AP Chemistry
AP Computer Science Principles
AP English Language
AP English Literature
AP European History
AP Environmental Science
AP Physics 1
AP Physics 2
AP Psychology
AP Spanish
AP Statistics
AP Studio Art
AP United States History
AP U.S. Government & Politics

Athletics

Fall Sports:
 Cross Country (Boys and Girls)
 Football (Boys)
 Golf (Girls)
 Tennis (Girls)
 Volleyball (Girls)
 Water Polo (Boys)
Winter Sports:
 Basketball (Boys)
 Basketball (Girls)
 Soccer (Boys)
 Soccer (Girls)
 Water Polo (Girls)
 Wrestling (Boys and Girls)
Spring Sports:
 Baseball (Boys)
 Golf (Boys)
 Softball (Girls)
 Swimming & Dive (Boys and Girls)
 Tennis (Boys)
 Track & Field (Boys and Girls)
 Volleyball (Boys)
 Lacrosse (Boys and Girls)

Notable alumni
 Carlon Brown - basketball player, 2013-14 top scorer in the Israel Basketball Premier League
 Kawhi Leonard - NBA player for the Los Angeles Clippers
 Robert Malone - NFL player
 Tony Snell - NBA player for the Atlanta Hawks

Notes

External links

Educational institutions established in 1999
High schools in Riverside, California
Public high schools in California
1999 establishments in California